Meadow's syndrome or Meadows syndrome can refer to:
 Münchausen syndrome by proxy, named for Roy Meadow, who characterized it in 1977
 Postpartum cardiomyopathy, named for William Meadows, who characterized it in 1957